Robert Burton "Mack" McCormick (August 3, 1930 – November 18, 2015) was an American musicologist and folklorist.

Biography 
McCormick was born in 1930 in Pittsburgh, Pennsylvania. He was brought up by his mother, in Alabama, Colorado, West Virginia and Texas, as she traveled to find work as a hospital technician.

Career 
He dropped out of high school to work at a ballroom in Cedar Point, Ohio, running errands for the musicians performing there. He later worked as an electrician, cook, carnival worker and taxi driver. In 1946, he met record store owner and discographer Orin Blackstone in New Orleans and began assisting him in researching and compiling Blackstone's multivolume Index to Jazz. McCormick became Texas correspondent for Down Beat in 1949. He developed an interest in blues and began traveling and researching the lives and origins of undocumented blues musicians around the country and learning about folk traditions and customs.

In the late 1950s, McCormick "discovered" and recorded Mance Lipscomb, Robert Shaw and Lightnin' Hopkins. At the 1965 Newport Folk Festival, he assembled a group of former convicts who had never performed together, and after trying but failing to get Bob Dylan to end his rehearsals with members of the Paul Butterfield Blues Band, cut off Dylan's electricity supply, possibly giving rise to the apocryphal story that Pete Seeger had attempted to cut off the power during Dylan's debut performance with electric guitars and keyboards.

McCormick wrote numerous magazine articles and album liner notes and assembled an extensive private archive of Texas musical history. He researched the lives of dead blues musicians, such as Robert Johnson and Henry Thomas. He began research on Johnson in 1972, while working for the Smithsonian Institution, and interviewed people who had known the musician. McCormick originally intended to publish his research as a book, Biography of a Phantom, but he never completed it, and he later said that he had lost interest in it.  The book Biography of a Phantom, edited by John W. Troutman, was eventually set to be published by Smithsonian Books in 2023.

His unfinished research with Paul Oliver on Texas blues was published in 2019 by Texas A&M University Press as The Blues Come to Texas.

Death 
He died on November 18, 2015, from esophageal cancer, at the age of 85.

Archives
In 2022 it was announced that McCormick's archive, including 590 reels of sound recordings, unpublished manuscripts, photographs, playbills, booking contracts, and miscellaneous materials and  ephemera concerning blues musicians would be housed at the Smithsonian’s Museum of American History.

Bibliography

References

External links 
  RIP, Mack McCormick, obituary by Michael Hall, Texas Monthly
 Mac McCormick Still Has the Blues by Michael Hall
 The Ballad of Geeshie and Elvie by John Jeremiah Sullivan

1930 births
2015 deaths
American folklorists
American music historians
American male non-fiction writers
American musicologists
Writers from Pittsburgh
Historians from Pennsylvania